Švenčionys District Municipality is one of 60 municipalities in Lithuania. 

It has significant Polish minority population in Lithuania, with quarter of the population claiming Polish ethnicity.

International relations

Twin towns — Sister cities
Švenčionys district municipality is twinned with the following towns:
  Świdnica, Poland

See also
Švenčionys
Vasiuliškė

References

External links

 
Municipalities of Vilnius County
Municipalities of Lithuania